Aldea San Juan is a village, rural center and municipality in Entre Ríos Province in north-eastern Argentina. It is located 42 km north of Gualeguaychú city and has a population of 466 inhabitants (INDEC, 2001).
The main local activity is agriculture, which is the economy's driving force. It was founded by a group of Volga German immigrants. It has an Evangelical Temple, a Lutheran Temple, and Volga German descendants' associations.

History
These lands were owned by Jacobo Spangenberg, who sold them to Volga German colonists in 1889. Nineteen families arrived from the Volga. They subsequently founded three villages: San Juan, Aldea San Antonio and Santa Celia. Thirty families established residence in San Juan, most of them from Bauer and Messer in the Volga basin.

References

Populated places in Entre Ríos Province
Volga German diaspora